Makhmur District is a district in Erbil governorate. The district is part of the disputed territories.

History 
Before 1991 the large district of Makhmur was part of Nineveh Governorate. In 1997~1998, the Makhmour refugee camp was created North-East ofnthe town to host refugees from Kurdish villages depopulated by Turkey. In 2003 Makhmur District became a part of Erbil Governorate. This lasted until 2008, when until further notice, the KRG agreed to hand over the district to the Federal Government. The district changed hands again in 2014, during the invasion of ISIS. Today, most of the district including its capital is administered as part of Ninawah Governorate.

See also 

 Makhmour Refugee Camp

References

Districts of Erbil Governorate
Districts of Iraq